Kapaun Mt. Carmel Catholic High School, sometimes called Kapaun, is a private, four year, co-educational, secondary school operated by the Roman Catholic Diocese of Wichita.  It is located on the east side of Wichita, Kansas.  The school colors are blue and white. The average annual enrollment is approximately 850 students.

Kapaun Mt. Carmel is a member of the Kansas State High School Activities Association and offers a variety of sports programs. Athletic teams compete in the 5A division and are known as the "Crusaders". Extracurricular activities are also offered in the form of performing arts, school publications, and clubs.

History
Chaplain Kapaun Memorial High School was named after Chaplain Emil Kapaun, a priest of the Wichita Diocese who served and died in the Korean War.  It opened in 1956 another site on east Central Ave (not the same as the present site), in east Wichita, and was operated by the Jesuits as a preparatory school for young men.  Jesuits served at the school in various capacities until the early 1990s.  Alumni of the initial Chaplain Kapaun school recall that under the basketball court's "floating floor" was a rifle range, where students - under supervision - practiced marksmanship with school-supplied .22 cal rifles, and that supported a school rifle team.

Mount Carmel Academy was established in 1887 by the Sisters of Charity of the Blessed Virgin Mary (BVM) as a girl's boarding school.  The BVM sisters served the school until the early 1990s.  John (Jack) Vickers (1891-1940) was an oil mogul who got his start in Butler County oil fields and former "Vickers Oil Refinery" in Potwin.  In 1934, Vickers built a large mansion at 8500 E Central (named "Vickridge").  In 1961, his estate became the new site for "Mount Carmel Academy".

Kapaun Mt. Carmel High School was established in 1971 as the result of the merger of "Chaplain Kapaun Memorial High School" and "Mount Carmel Academy" at the current Vickridge location.

In 2006, Kapaun Mt. Carmel began a $2.3 million expansion to the school. A new restroom was constructed, as well as expanded art and debate rooms, new teacher lounges, and a new student commons area. The expansion was completed in August 2007.

Academics
Kapaun Mt. Carmel Catholic High School is also accredited by the State of Kansas, and the National Catholic Educational Association. Institutional membership is held in the National Association of College Admissions Counseling and several other professional organizations.

Extracurricular activities

Athletics
The Crusaders compete in the Greater Wichita Athletic League (GWAL) and are classified as a 5A school, the second-largest classification in Kansas according to the Kansas State High School Activities Association. Throughout its history, Kapaun Mt. Carmel has won 102 state championships in various sports.

Football
From 1969-1990, Eddie Kriwiel coached football and served as the athletic director at Kapaun Mt. Carmel High School. Kriwiel won 297 games as a high school football coach and his teams had just two losing seasons in 36 years. His teams played in 12 state championship games and won 9.

Golf
Coach Kriwiel was also successful as a high school golf coach. From 1969-1990, his teams won 20 state titles and 28 top-four finishes. While unofficial, this is believed by many to be a national record. Coach Corey Novascone brought success back to the Kapaun Mt Carmel Golf team. Compiling 7 state titles in a row as a head coach for both Boys and Girls Golf. The girls' golf team had a 30 year stretch between state titles. As of 2022, the boys golf team holds the national record for most state championships as a high school team at 33.

Other sports

Kapaun Mt. Carmel currently has the most Kansas state championships in football, wrestling, and golf as well as holding two grand state wrestling championships. The grand state wrestling championship tournament was only held twice, with Kapaun winning both.

Sports programs

Fall
 Football
 Volleyball
 Boys' Cross-Country
 Girls' Cross-Country
 Girls' Golf
 Boys' Soccer
 Girls' Tennis
 Cheerleading
 Girls' Gymnastics

Winter
 Boys' Basketball
 Girls' Basketball
 Wrestling
 Boys' Bowling
 Girls' Bowling
 Winter Cheerleading
 Boys' Swimming & Diving

Spring
 Baseball
 Boys' Golf
 Boys' Tennis
 Girls' Soccer
 Girls' Swimming & Diving
 Softball
 Boys' Track and Field
 Girls' Track and Field

State championships

Non-athletic activities

Science Olympiad
Kapaun Mt. Carmel won the Kansas State Science Olympiad competition from 2003 to 2007.

Scholars Bowl
The Crusaders won the Scholars Bowl State Tournament in 1996, 2001, 2002, 2013 and 2017.

Eco Meet
Kapaun Mt. Carmel won the State Eco-Meet competition in 2005 and 2006.

Notable alumni
 David Arkin, former player for the Dallas Cowboys
 Dan and Frank Carney, founders of Pizza Hut
 Greg Dreiling, former NBA player
 Tysyn Hartman, former NFL player
 Grier Jones, former PGA Tour golfer, 1968 NCAA champion and former golf coach at Wichita State University
 Ben Powers, offensive lineman Denver Broncos
 Mary Ann Coady Weinand, psychiatrist
 Matt Schlapp, political lobbyist, political analyst on television

Notable faculty
 Eddie Kriwiel, football and golf coach, member of 7 Kansas Halls of Fame

See also

 Education in Kansas
 List of high schools in Kansas

References

Further reading
 History of Wichita and Sedgwick County Kansas : Past and present, including an account of the cities, towns, and villages of the county; 2 Volumes; O.H. Bentley; C.F. Cooper & Co; 454 / 479 pages; 1910. (Volume1 - Download 20MB PDF eBook),(Volume2 - Download 31MB PDF eBook)

External links
 
 Historical
 Mt. Carmel Academy - Then and Now
 Mt. Carmel Academy history 1, 2, 3 specialcollections.wichita.edu

 

Roman Catholic Diocese of Wichita
Schools in Wichita, Kansas
Catholic secondary schools in Kansas
Educational institutions established in 1971
1971 establishments in Kansas